Sergiyevsky is a rural locality (a khutor) in Alexandrovskoye Rural Settlement, Talovsky District, Voronezh Oblast, Russia. The population was 81 as of 2010. There are 4 streets.

Geography 
Sergiyevsky is located 15 km north of Talovaya (the district's administrative centre) by road. Novotroitsky is the nearest rural locality.

References 

Rural localities in Talovsky District